The Rambam Maimonides Medical Journal is a quarterly peer-reviewed open access medical journal sponsored by Rambam Health Care Campus covering medical research, in the spirit of Maimonides. The journal was established in July 2010 and the editor-in-chief is Shraga Blazer.

The journal is abstracted and indexed in PubMed Central, EBSCO Information Services, the Emerging Sources Citation Index, SCOPUS, Journal Citation Reports, and the Directory of Open Access Journals.

Although the journal does not yet have an impact factor (IF) via Journal Citation Reports, as of June 2022, the SCOPUS CiteScore Factor is 2.0 (212 citations received in 2018-to date divided by 105 documents published in 2018-to date).

References

External links

General medical journals
Maimonides
Quarterly journals
Creative Commons Attribution-licensed journals
English-language journals
Publications established in 2010
Academic journals published by non-profit organizations